Edward Moane (2 August 1890 – 11 July 1973) was an Irish politician and farmer. He was first elected to Dáil Éireann as a Fianna Fáil Teachta Dála (TD) for the Mayo South constituency at the 1932 general election. He was re-elected at the 1933 and 1937 general elections but lost his seat at the 1938 general election.

References

1890 births
1973 deaths
Fianna Fáil TDs
Members of the 7th Dáil
Members of the 8th Dáil
Members of the 9th Dáil
Irish farmers
Politicians from County Mayo